Jesse Niinimäki (born August 19, 1983) is a Finnish professional ice hockey forward who is currently a free agent. He was last under contract with the Nikko Icebucks of the Asia League Ice Hockey having signed for the team on July 20, 2017, but ultimately never played for the team. Niinimäki was selected by the Edmonton Oilers in the first round (15th overall) of the 2002 NHL Entry Draft.

Playing career
Niinimäki spent the 2004–05 season with the Edmonton Road Runners in the American Hockey League and Ilves, and signed with Jokerit for the 2005–06 season. After a disappointing fall season, Niinimäki was released from his contract with Jokerit in January 2006, and hired by JYP for the rest of the season.

After the 2005–06 season, Niinimäki moved to Sweden and played for Elitserien side Luleå HF in 37 games. Niinimäki also played for the German DEL team Krefeld Pinguine. The tenure in Germany lasted for 9 games plus 2 games in the playoffs. After completion of the 2006–07 season Niinimäki returned to Luleå but was released during September 2007. Niinimäki was acquired by Swiss Nationalliga A team HC Davos, but in January 2008 he returned to HPK.

Personal life
He is the son of former Finnish international footballer, Jari Niinimäki.

Career statistics

Regular season and playoffs

International

References

External links

1983 births
Amur Khabarovsk players
Brynäs IF players
HC Davos players
Edmonton Oilers draft picks
Edmonton Road Runners players
SHC Fassa players
Finnish ice hockey centres
HDD Olimpija Ljubljana players
HPK players
Ilves players
Jokerit players
JYP Jyväskylä players
Krefeld Pinguine players
Lahti Pelicans players
Lempäälän Kisa players
Living people
Luleå HF players
National Hockey League first-round draft picks
Ice hockey people from Tampere
Vaasan Sport players
Yunost Minsk players